Mitzi Green (born Elizabeth Keno; October 22, 1920 – May 24, 1969) was an American child actress and singer for Paramount and RKO, in the early "talkies" era.  She then acted on Broadway and in other stage works, as well as in films and on television.

Early years
Mitzi Green was born in The Bronx on October 22, 1920. Starting at the age 3, she began appearing in her parents' vaudeville act under the name Little Mitzi.

Career
Green was often featured in Paramount's early talkies, as an outspoken and mischievous little girl alongside studio stars Clara Bow, Jack Oakie, Ed Wynn, Leon Errol, and Edna May Oliver among others. Green was a gifted mimic and her celebrity imitations were often worked into the films. She was cast (against type) opposite Jackie Coogan in two Mark Twain adaptations, Tom Sawyer (1930) and Huckleberry Finn (1931). Paramount released her in 1931, as she was rapidly outgrowing child roles.

She moved to RKO for two pictures, both adaptations of works from other media. She played the title role in Little Orphan Annie (1932), based on the popular comic strip, with Edgar Kennedy as Daddy Warbucks. She also appeared as the precocious kid sister in Girl Crazy (1932), the first movie version of the George Gershwin-Ira Gershwin stage musical. Green brightened the film with surprising impersonations of George Arliss and her former co-star Edna May Oliver.

At the age of 14, she played a soubrette role in Transatlantic Merry-Go-Round (1934), produced independently by Edward Small for United Artists release. It did not result in further film offers, and Green left Hollywood. 

She went on to Broadway, where she starred in the original production of Rodgers and Hart's Babes in Arms (1937). Two of Green's numbers in the musical were "My Funny Valentine," which would later become a jazz standard in many cover recordings and performances, and "The Lady is a Tramp".

Green made one more film in 1940 (Santa Fe Trail with Errol Flynn), then went back to stage and nightclub work, including Walk with Music by Hoagy Carmichael and Johnny Mercer, and the Betty Comden and Adolph Green musical Billion Dollar Baby.  Green married Broadway (and later movie and TV) director Joseph Pevney and retired to raise a family. At age 31 she returned briefly to the screen opposite Abbott and Costello in Lost in Alaska (1952) and in Bloodhounds of Broadway (1952), co-starring another Mitzi—Mitzi Gaynor.

In 1955, she starred with Virginia Gibson and Gordon Jones in the short-lived NBC TV sitcom So This Is Hollywood, in the role of Queenie Dugan, a high-spirited stuntwoman.

After a brief stint on the nightclub circuit, Green retired again, although she did appear in summer stock and dinner theater around the Los Angeles area thereafter, and she appeared occasionally as a guest on talk shows.

Recognition
For her contributions to the motion picture industry, Green received a star on the Hollywood Walk of Fame at 6430 Hollywood Blvd.

Death
On May 24, 1969, Green died in Huntington Beach, California, at age 48, of cancer.

Partial filmography

Stage
 Babes in Arms (1937)
 Walk with Music (1940)
 Let Freedom Sing (1942)
 Billion Dollar Baby (1945)

Bibliography
 Best, Marc. Those Endearing Young Charms: Child Performers of the Screen (South Brunswick and New York: Barnes & Co., 1971), pp. 100–104.

References

External links

 
 
 Photographs of Mitzi Green and bibliography

1920 births
1969 deaths
American child actresses
American film actresses
American musical theatre actresses
American television actresses
Actresses from New York City
Burials at Eden Memorial Park Cemetery
Deaths from cancer in California
Paramount Pictures contract players
20th-century American actresses
20th-century American singers
20th-century American women singers